Hicham Bouchicha (born 19 May 1989) is an Algerian athlete specialising in the 3000 metres steeplechase. He represented his country at the 2013 and 2015 World Championships reaching the final on the second occasion.

Competition record

References

External links
 

1989 births
Living people
Algerian male middle-distance runners
Algerian male steeplechase runners
World Athletics Championships athletes for Algeria
Place of birth missing (living people)
Athletes (track and field) at the 2016 Summer Olympics
Olympic athletes of Algeria
Athletes (track and field) at the 2018 Mediterranean Games
Athletes (track and field) at the 2022 Mediterranean Games
Athletes (track and field) at the 2015 African Games
African Games competitors for Algeria
Mediterranean Games competitors for Algeria
Athletes (track and field) at the 2020 Summer Olympics
21st-century Algerian people